Notts, Lincs & Derbyshire 5 was a short lived tier 11 English Rugby Union league with teams from Nottinghamshire, Lincolnshire and Derbyshire taking part.  Promoted teams moved up to Notts, Lincs & Derbyshire 4 and there was no relegation.  The division was cancelled at the end of the 1991–92 season and the majority of teams transferred into Notts, Lincs & Derbyshire 4.

Original teams

When this division was introduced in 1990 it contained the following teams:

Bolsover
Derby College
Leesbrook
Monson
Rainworth
Stamford College
Whitwell
Yarborough Bees

Notts, Lincs & Derbyshire 5 honours

Number of league titles

Derby College (1)
Stamford College (1)

Notes

See also
Notts, Lincs & Derbyshire 1
Notts, Lincs & Derbyshire 2
Notts, Lincs & Derbyshire 3
Notts, Lincs & Derbyshire 4
Midlands RFU
Notts, Lincs & Derbyshire RFU
English rugby union system
Rugby union in England

References

External links
 NLD RFU website

Defunct rugby union leagues in England
Rugby union in Nottinghamshire
Rugby union in Derbyshire
Rugby union in Lincolnshire
Sports leagues established in 1990
Sports leagues disestablished in 1992